Harem Scarem are a Canadian melodic rock band.

Harem Scarem may also refer to:

Harem Scarem (1927 film), a William M. Pizor film production
 Harem Scarem (folk band), a Scottish folk band
 Harem Scarem (Australian band), an Australian rock band, recorded for Citadel Records
 Harem Scarem (album), a 1991 album by the Canadian band Harem Scarem
 "Harem Scarem", a song by the Dutch band Focus from their 1974 album Hamburger Concerto
 Harem Scarem, a 1928 short cartoon starting Oswald the Lucky Rabbit, an early Disney character

See also
 Harum Scarum (disambiguation)
 Harem (disambiguation)